Stanford Department of Electrical Engineering, also known as EE; Double E, is a department at Stanford University. Established in 1894, it is one of nine engineering departments that comprise Stanford University School of Engineering, and in 1971, had the largest graduate enrollment of any department at Stanford University. The department is currently located in the David Packard Building on Jane Stanford Way in Stanford, California.

History

Early developments (1800s-1940s)

Stanford University opened in 1891, and within the year, courses addressing topics such as electrical currents and magnetism were being taught by professors such as A.P. Carman. Professor Frederic A.C. Perrine was the first faculty to teach the subject of electrical engineering at Stanford, in 1893. In 1983, when F.A.C. Perrine was appointed Stanford's first Professor of Electrical Engineering, the program focused on central generating plants for electricity. Frederic A.C. Perrine, in 1893, made an acknowledgement of gifts to Stanford's Electrical Engineering Department in The Stanford Daily, among them 30 horse power double reduction street-railroad motor, field magnets, and various machines from the General Electric Company and wires from American Electrical Works and New England Butt Company. 

Prior to 1894, electrical engineering had been taught as part of the Physics and Mechanical Engineering curriculum. That year, the EE Department was established in the Engineering Labs. In 1894, the first undergraduate degree in electrical engineering was awarded to Lucien Howard Gilmore of Capron, Illinois. 

In January 1894, the electrical engineering department proposed building an electrical railroad from the university to Palo Alto. Perrine gave the project to students, with the land having been purchased by private owners prior for a railroad that had fallen through. The design proposed no overhead wires, with the plant to be owned by Stanford University, and the engineering and management to be entirely constructed by the different engineering departments at Stanford. A telegraph office was set up in the Electrical Engineering building in 1897 to act as an operator for the Western Union Company. 
 
In 1898, it was reported that Perrine was taking a two year leave of absence from teaching, but would continue to reside in Palo Alto and would still have charge of the Electrical Engineering department. With the advancement of electricity, industry and employment opportunities proved plentiful for those with knowledge in the subject. In 1899, Standard Electrical Company completed one of the world's longest transmission lines. Professor FAC Perrine was the engineer, and the following year, he left academia for industry. When Perrine left in 1898, the department was administered instead by civil or mechanical engineering professors instead until 1905. That year, Harris J. Ryan was named both Professor and Chair of Electrical Engineering. Under Ryan, the department began teaching high voltage transmission of electric power.

A branch association formed at Stanford University of the American Institute of Electrical Engineers (AIEE) in 1904, with membership limited to upper classmen in the Stanford Electrical Engineering Department. In 1919, Leonard F. Fuller earned a PhD degree at Stanford's Electrical Engineering Department. Primary faculty of the EE department as of 1923 included Ryan as Professor, J.C. Clark as Associate Professor, H.H. Henline as Assistant Professor, and two instructors. Henline started the Communications Laboratory in 1924.

In 1925, Stanford established the School of Engineering, with all undergraduate degrees in engineering given out by the school instead of the departments with the new change. F.E. Terman joined EE as an instructor, introducing radio courses, and also in 1925, the department opened The Ryan High Voltage Laboratory, financed in large part by Los Angeles and the private power industry.

Leonard Fuller returned to Stanford to serve as an acting professor of electrical engineering from 1946 until he retired in 1954.

Government contracts (1940s - 1960s)

According to historian Piero Scaruffi, in 1946, Frederick M. Terman became dean of Stanford's engineering school, using his connections with the military and the Office of Naval Research to both start and fund the Electronics Research Lab (ERL). The Korean War in 1950 brought in a new infusion of funds from the Office of Naval Research, and Terman used the money to open the Applied Electronics Library, then opening the adjacent Stanford Industrial Park nearby for private business.  Terman served as head of the Electrical Engineering Department and dean of the school of Engineering until he retired in 1965.

In 1947, E. Ginzton in the EE department helped design and build the first Linear Accelerator. Also that year, a Joint Services Electronics Contract was signed, with the department stating on its website that the contract started "large scale Federal support of Department Research."

The department's Microwave Laboratory in 1949 was moved into a new building with Edward Ginzton as director, and was later turned into the Ginzton Laboratory. The department opened its Electronics Research Library (ERL) in 1951, with HP and Gilfillan "significantly" supporting construction until 1956, according to the department. An IBM 650 computer was maintained in ERL, which was the only air-conditioned room in the building. In 1955, the department held its first courses in digital and analog computing. In 1955, Stanford merged the Electronics Research Laboratory and the Applied Electronics Laboratory into the Systems Engineering Laboratory, to focus on electronic warfare under Terman. According to Stanford, the Applied Electronics Laboratory (AEL) was constructed in 1958 to "support military classified research in electronic countermeasures."

GIbbons Plan and AEL occupations (1960s - 1970s)
John G. Linvill was appointed EE chair in 1964 and subsequently built the semiconductor program at Stanford.

In May 1966, after comments by Stanford administration about contracts, there was picketing by students at Stanford University protesting the Electrical Engineering Department's contract with the Central Intelligence Agency. Heffner kept the nature what he called "purely an engineering research project" secret, stating "we accept grants from donors with whom we do not particularly care to be allied, but we will not refuse a gift if its objectives are worthwhile."

In January 1969, chairman of the Electrical Engineering Department John Linvill stated that the department would allow the enrollment of "minority group" students to study for advanced degrees in electrical engineering. In the Gibbons Plan, the students were only allowed partial credits, with their studies financed by their external employers.

On April 3, 1969, 700 students voted to occupy the AEL. This formed the April Third Movement, a coalition of Stanford campus organizations, occupied the Applied Electronics Laboratory for nine days, in protest for Stanford doing classified work for the government. 1400 Stanford community members signed a statement of participation. At the time, the lab was linked with classified military electronics research and electronic warfare being used against the Vietnamese people. The students of the April Third Movement occupied the hallways of the Applied Electronics Lab building, shutting down research for the occupation. Students slept on the roof of the lab, with large nightly meetings. The group also used the publishing materials in the basement to product documents linking Stanford trustees to defense contractors. The sit-in ultimately led to the school severing ties with the former Stanford Research Institute and moving its military research off campus. 

In later 1969, the Applied Electronics Laboratory (AEL), was a part of the Stanford Electronic Laboratory, which was the "research affiliate of the electrical engineering department, especially in doctoral research." That year, AEL director William Rambo admitted after criticism and a sit-in protest that the laboratory was working with the Department of Defense in matters related to the Vietnam War.

In 1969, Stanford EE classes were broadcast to Silicon Valley by the Stanford Instructional Television Network for the first time.

In 1971, the Electrical Engineering Department had the largest graduate enrollment of any department at Stanford University.

Recent chairs and research (1980s - 2020s)

In 1981, R.L.White was appointed EE chair, with a number of successions over the next two decades.

In 1997, James Plummer became the department chair, as the John M. Fluke Professor of Electrical Engineering. He became dean of the overall engineering department in 1999. Mark Horowitz was appointed chair of EE in 2009.

Jelena Vučković was the "Fortinet Founders" chair of the department as of 2023, leading the department's Nanoscale and Quantum Photonics (NQP) lab. The department is currently based out of the David Packard Building on Jane Stanford Way in Stanford, California. Research is also done out of other locations at Stanford University.

Degrees
The Stanford University Department of Electrical Engineering offers Bachelor of Science degrees with a major in Electrical Engineering, full-time Master of Science degrees, and doctoral of philosophy (EE PhD) degrees.

Degree programs offer some flexible options, such as coterminal BS and MS degrees completed in 5 years. The department has two joint degree programs. The joint EE MS/MBA degree is managed in conjunction with the Stanford Graduate School of Business. The JD/EE MS degree is managed in conjunction with the Stanford Law School. The department also offers online graduate certificates, and non-degree options (NDO) with four online certificate programs for graduate-level courses.

Research areas
Electrical Engineering is a broad subject. Stanford's EE Department presents their research in 3 core areas, and 2 interdisciplinary areas.
 Information Systems & Science 
 Hardware/Software Systems
 Physical Technology & Science
 (Interdisciplinary) Energy 
 (Interdisciplinary) Biomedical

Published work
In late 2021 a team in the department was working on ultra-thin solar cell technology, publishing in Nature Communications in December 2021, with co-authors including Nassiri Nazif and Alwin Daus. In December 2022, Yecun Wu of the department was a co-author of Observation of an intermediate state during lithium intercalation of twisted bilayer MoS2 published in Nature.

Notable faculty and alumni

See also
Cyril Frank Elwell

References

External links
Stanford University Department of Electrical Engineering

Stanford University School of Engineering